Hanyuan may refer to:
Hanyuan County, in Sichuan, China
Hancheng, Shaanxi, formerly known as Hanyuan, a city in Shaanxi, China